Bersted is an electoral division of West Sussex in the United Kingdom and returns one member to sit on West Sussex County Council.

Extent
The division covers the community of North Bersted, which forms part of the urban area of Bognor Regis; and the hamlet of Shripney.

It comprises the following Arun District wards: the northern and western part of Bersted Ward, and Pevensey Ward; and of the following civil parishes: the northern and western part of Bersted, and the Pevensey Ward area of Bognor Regis.

Election result

2021 Election
Results of the election held on 6 May 2021:

2017 Election
Results of the election held on 4 May 2017:

2013 Election
Results of the election held on 2 May 2013:

2009 Election
Results of the election held on 4 June 2009:

2005 Election
Results of the election held on 5 May 2005:

References
Election Results - West Sussex County Council

External links
 West Sussex County Council
 Election Maps
 Paul Dendle Conservative Candidate in 2013 election

Electoral Divisions of West Sussex